Boychick is a 1971 novel by American writer Leo Skir. The book is pederastic, and centers on 28 year-old Leo Tsalis falling in love with Leroy, a 16 year-old boy he calls Boychick, after a brief sexual encounter. It received a mixed critical reception in the gay press; its plot was both criticized as cliché and praised as an authentic expression of gay life in New York City.

Background 
The book was written by Leo Skir, probably prior to the Stonewall riots of 1969, and published by Winter House; it was the first novel credited to Skir, although he had written others pseudonymously, including Hours as "Lon Albert" (1969). Skir was a Jewish American and gay writer, who published articles in the Sh'ma Journal and the lesbian journal The Ladder about his Jewish and gay identities. Jewish historian Noam Sienna said that a 1972 narrative by Skir was likely the first openly gay Jewish work to be published in an American Jewish publication.

The book was sold for $5.75 and contained 156 pages. It had a minute readership because of its small-press printing. A portion of the book was first published in a 1968 anthology, and the full book was republished by Elysian Fields in 1982.

Plot 
Leo Tsalis is a 28 year-old Jewish American graduate student studying Old English at New York University. In the showers of Hotel St. George's pool in New York City, he meets a naked 16 year-old boy named Leroy—though he looks "about fourteen or fifteen"—and the two leave together. They take the subway to Leo's friend's house in order to have a brief sexual encounter; instead, his friend's roommate asks them to leave. After walking together for a short while, Leo leaves his phone number with Leroy, who he calls Boychick, but does not gather any of his contact information. Boychick arrives at Leo's house the next day, and they attempt to have sex; Leo cannot maintain an erection, so he instead gives a handjob to the boy. Boychick is almost late for work, so Leo gives him money for the subway with a request to be called later. Although he never receives a call, Leo becomes infatuated with Boychick, and tells his friends of their encounter, and of his apprehension because Boychick is under the age of consent in New York. Leo decides he is in love and goes out to search for him, scouring every place that Boychick mentioned. As he looks, he becomes more infatuated with the boy and imagines the two of them together and holding conversation.

Eventually, Boychick calls Leo to say they will meet again soon. Although he promised to show up on a specific day, he does not; later he calls Leo to say he is bringing an older man to Leo's home, where Boychick and the older man have sex. After the older man leaves, Leo walks with Boychick to the subway, and they ride in the same car together and make conversation. Boychick is cold to him and, fearing his uncle's retaliation—he does not want his uncle to know that he is gay—he asks Leo to leave him alone. Leo obliges, and once he returns home, he cries.

Reception 
The book has received little scholarly attention. Skir was involved in the Beat Generation, and many of the novel's characters were based on others in the movement, including Elise Cowen, Allen Ginsberg and his partner Peter Orlovsky, and Janine Pommy Vega. The book was called one of the "pederastic erotic classics" alongside Jean Cocteau's The White Paper and Ronald Tavel's Street of Stairs, by LGBT studies scholar James T. Sears.

In the gay San Francisco magazine Vector, literary critic Frank Howell called the book a "depressing little tome" and criticized the subject matter. The sicky' book", as he called it, expressed genuine artistic vision by Skir—Howell said the characters and settings were well-crafted—but that the cliché plot of a man failing to find love was ultimately pointless, and he questioned why the book was written at all. He also criticized the plot, which he identified as sometimes moving without connection to the underlying story, and the characters, who he said lacked depth. In contrast, Dick Leitsch, writing in the magazine Gay, said the novel's theme of loss of innocence was presented well, and contrasted its modern-day and realistic expression of gay life to the "fantasy worlds" in the works of Erich Segal, D. H. Lawrence, and Wilhelm Reich. He praised the tenderness and authenticity of its writing. Canadian writer Ian Young similarly said the prose was realistic, and it offered a "more humorous view" than the traditional form of gay literature.

The Oscar Wilde Bookshop declined to stock Boychick, saying that part of its title—"chick"—was a sexist word used to unfavorably describe women. In 1997, a first edition copy with a very fine rating for the book and its cover was listed for $85 or £53.

References

Citations

Bibliography

 
 
 
 
 
 
 
 
 
 
 
 

 

1970s LGBT novels
1971 debut novels
American LGBT novels
Jewish American novels
Pederastic literature